BJCC may refer to the:

Bathurst Jewish Community Centre
Birmingham–Jefferson Convention Complex